Barbara Wendy Arnott  (née Barron, born 1950) is a New Zealand politician. She served as the 18th mayor of Napier between 2001 and 2013, and was the first female mayor of the city.

Arnott is the daughter of Bill and Mollie Barron, and is married to David Arnott. In the 2014 New Year Honours, Arnott was appointed a Companion of the Queen's Service Order for services to local government and the community.

References

1950 births
Living people
Companions of the Queen's Service Order
Mayors of Napier, New Zealand
Women mayors of places in New Zealand